Citybus or City bus may refer to:

 City bus, also known as a commuter bus, transit bus, or public bus
 Citybus (Hong Kong), a bus operator headquartered in Hong Kong, with routes within Hong Kong as well as cross border routes between Hong Kong and Mainland China
 Citibus (Lubbock), a public transit service in Lubbock, Texas
 Citibus (New Zealand), a bus and coach company in New Zealand
 Citibus Tours, a bus company that operated in Greater Manchester, England
 Capital Citybus, a former London bus operator by Citybus Hong Kong
 Davenport Citibus, public transit in Davenport, Iowa
 Indore City Bus, a road transport system run by Indore City Transport Services Limited in India
 Plymouth Citybus, a bus operator in the city of Plymouth
 Southampton Citybus, a former bus company in Southampton, England